Ohkuma-ike dam is an earthfill dam located in Shiga prefecture in Japan. The dam is used for irrigation. The catchment area of the dam is 0.2 km2. The dam impounds about   ha of land when full and can store 20 thousand cubic meters of water. The construction of the dam was completed in 1920.

References

Dams in Shiga Prefecture
1920 establishments in Japan